Çortak is a village in Mut district of Mersin Province, Turkey. The population of the village is 162 as of 2012.

References

Villages in Mut District